Kyriakos Giaxis (born 3 April 2001) is a Greek professional footballer who plays as a midfielder for Super League 2 club PAOK B.

Career
Giaxis joined PAOK in 2018 from Panserraikos. He was first included in the first-team squad on 3 March 2021, for the Greek Football Cup game against Lamia.

Honours

Club
PAOK 
Greek Cup: 2020–21

Personal life

Giaxis hails from Tragilos, Serres.

References

External links
 

2001 births
Living people
Footballers from Serres
Greek footballers
Association football midfielders
Panserraikos F.C. players
PAOK FC players
Football League (Greece) players
Greece youth international footballers
PAOK FC B players